XHTXO-FM is a radio station on 92.9 FM in Taxco de Alarcón, Guerrero, Mexico. It is owned by Radio Cañón and carries the Exa FM format from MVS Radio.

History
XHTXO received its concession on September 4, 1991. It was initially owned by Edilberto Huesca Perrotín, owner of NRM Comunicaciones, and known as "Super Stereo". In 2002, ownership transferred to Super Stereo de Guerrero, S.A. de C.V. Two years later, the station was rebranded "Oye 92.9", in line with XEOYE-FM in Mexico City. The current concessionaire received the station in 2008 and adopted the present Exa FM format.

References

Radio stations in Guerrero
Radio stations established in 1991